Lulu Belle is a 1948 American drama musical romance film directed by Leslie Fenton and starring Dorothy Lamour. The film was an adaption of a sensational 1926 hit play by Charles MacArthur and Edward Sheldon, about a mulatto songstress, a "man-trap" who bewitched powerful men in New Orleans. This convoluted but heavily Code-sanitized film version of the play was about a Caucasian songbird who could not be true to her boxer beau. Although the film offered a change of pace for its star, Dorothy Lamour, it was not a success at the box office.

Plot 
Famous Broadway singer Lulu Belle (Dorothy Lamour) and Harry Randolph (Otto Kruger), her rich suitor, are found shot and severely wounded in her dressing room one night after the show. They are discovered by Lulu's best friend, Molly Benson (Glenda Farrell), and taken unconscious to the hospital.

Lulu's ex-husband, George Davis (George Montgomery), is accused of the shooting, since he has been previously convicted of attempted murder of another man who got too close to Lulu.  During George's interrogation he tells the story of how he met Lulu for the first time. She was performing in a dodgy place called the Natchez Café, and he was so taken with her that he left his fiancée and law practice to elope with her to New Orleans. They lived a wild life of luxury for awhile until his money ran out. She left for another man, high-stakes gambler Mark Brady (Albert Dekker) to support her expensive lifestyle.

George realizes that Lulu is bad news and leaves her. It doesn't take long before they get back together again. Lulu is offered a job by Mark, as a singer at a club he is starting, and George starts drinking heavily to drown his sorrows. He tries to get Molly to help stop Lulu's way of life. Lulu wants to divorce him to set him free. That night a wealthy man named Harry Randolph comes to visit the club with his wife (Charlotte Wynters). He is immediately smitten with Lulu, and decides to help her become a star on Broadway.

George picks a fight with boxer Butch and is beaten black and blue. George manages to stick a fork in Butch's eye and put an end to his fighting career. For this he is convicted and sentenced to prison. Lulu goes with Randolph, her new benefactor, to New York and Broadway. Randolph puts a lot of money and effort into building Lulu's career and a theater. After five years of working close together, Randolph asks Lulu to marry him. Lulu finds out that George has been released from prison and asks him to come her apartment. Mark turns up later in the evening at the theater and tries to force Lulu to come back with him, but she refuses. George meets Lulu right after the show that night and is sucked into her beam of charm again, when she proclaims her love for him. They decide to start a new life together. Without hesitation, Lulu tells Randolph that she won't marry him and he is upset. Then comes the night of the shooting.

Returning to the present, police commissioner Dixon (Addison Richards) gathers all the persons involved in the story, including Mrs. Randolph, at the dying Randolph's bedside. He asks Randolph to tell them who the shooter was, and he reveals it was his wife. George is vindicated and freed of all charges. He stays by Lulu's side long enough to make sure she will recover, then returns to his hometown alone.

Cast 
 Dorothy Lamour as Lulu Belle
 George Montgomery as George Davis
 Albert Dekker as Mark Brady
 Otto Kruger as Harry Randolph
 Glenda Farrell as Molly Benson
 Greg McClure as Butch Cooper
 Charlotte Wynters as Mrs. Randolph

References

External links 

Films set in New Orleans
1948 films
1940s musical drama films
American black-and-white films
Films about race and ethnicity
Films based on works by Edward Sheldon
American films based on plays
Columbia Pictures films
American musical drama films
1940s romantic musical films
American romantic musical films
American romantic drama films
1948 romantic drama films
1940s English-language films
1940s American films